Angel Rahov (born 1 July 1986) is a Bulgarian footballer who plays as a defender or defensive midfielder.

Career
His career started in Spartak Plovdiv, where he spent seven years playing at youth level - from 1997 to 2004.
Rahov then moved to Brestnik 1948 where he made 42 senior appearances and scored one goal for three seasons. His football career continued at FC Eurocollege for another three seasons. During that time Rahov made 101 senior appearances and scored 15 goals.

It was in 2010 when the big offer came, with Botev Plovdiv - one of the top Bulgarian football clubs coming to sign him. Rahov spent three seasons at Botev, playing 65 league matches and scoring 7 goals for the oldest Bulgarian football club.

Angel Rahov was loaned out to Rakovski for season 2013/14.

References

External links

1986 births
Living people
Bulgarian footballers
Association football defenders
Botev Plovdiv players
FC Montana players
First Professional Football League (Bulgaria) players